Friar's Oven is a 4.0 hectare biological Site of Special Scientific Interest in Somerset, notified in 1989.

Sources
 English Nature citation sheet for the site (accessed 9 August 2006)

External links
 English Nature website (SSSI information)

Sites of Special Scientific Interest in Somerset
Sites of Special Scientific Interest notified in 1989